Lo Chen-Jung (born 30 November 1961 in Chiayi, Taiwan) is a retired Taiwanese left-handed baseball pitcher. He had been a member of the amateur Taiwan Power Company Baseball Team throughout his career. He was widely regarded as the best left-handed Taiwanese pitcher of his generation and was a frequent member of the Chinese Taipei national baseball team between mid-1980s and early 1990s, competing in the 1988 and 1992 Summer Olympics where he won a silver medal in 1992.

Despite hearty invitation from the Jungo Bears and Uni-President Lions,  after the 1992 Olympics Lo opted to retire from baseball field and became the only member in the 1992 Olympics Chinese Taipei national baseball team who did not later join professional baseball. He has since run some business in his hometown Chiayi, and occasionally coaches local Little or Youth League baseball teams.

References

External links
profile

1961 births
Living people
Baseball players at the 1988 Summer Olympics
Baseball players at the 1992 Summer Olympics
Olympic baseball players of Taiwan
Taiwanese baseball players
Olympic silver medalists for Taiwan
People from Chiayi
Olympic medalists in baseball
Baseball players at the 1990 Asian Games

Medalists at the 1992 Summer Olympics
Asian Games competitors for Chinese Taipei